Unlimited energy may refer to:

Perpetual motion, a device or system that delivers more energy than was put into it
Sustainable energy, the provision of energy such that it meets the needs of the present without compromising the ability of future generations to meet their needs
Renewable energy, energy that uses natural resources that may be naturally replenished

See also
Free energy suppression, a conspiracy theory that says that technology that could produce unlimited energy is being suppressed by special interest groups